Alex Roberto Santana Rafael (born 10 November 1989), sometimes known as Alex Muralha, is a Brazilian footballer who plays as a goalkeeper for Mirassol, on loan from Coritiba.

Career

Figueirense
In April 2014 Alex signed with Figueirense in a free transfer.

Flamengo
After an impressive 2015 season, Flamengo signed with Alex from Figueirense in a R$4 million transfer fee on 2 January 2016. The club expected him to make an instant impact, although stayed as the backup goalkeeper until Paulo Victor suffered an injury in June. Since then he took the starter position and impressed Brazil coach Tite receiving his first call up.

On 28 December 2016 Alex signed another two-year contract with Flamengo until December 2018.

Coritiba (loan)
On 6 March 2019, he joined Coritiba on loan from Flamengo until December 2019.

Club statistics

International career
On 16 September 2016 he was called up to the Brazil national team for the first time to play 2018 FIFA World Cup qualifying matches against Bolivia and Venezuela.

Honours
Cuiabá
Campeonato Mato-Grossense: 2013

Flamengo
Campeonato Carioca: 2017

References

External links

 Análisis Alex Muralha

1989 births
Living people
People from Três Corações
Sportspeople from Minas Gerais
Brazilian footballers
Association football goalkeepers
Campeonato Brasileiro Série A players
Votoraty Futebol Clube players
Comercial Futebol Clube (Ribeirão Preto) players
Cuiabá Esporte Clube players
Mirassol Futebol Clube players
Figueirense FC players
CR Flamengo footballers
Coritiba Foot Ball Club players
J1 League players
J2 League players
Shonan Bellmare players
Albirex Niigata players
Brazilian expatriate footballers
Brazilian expatriate sportspeople in Japan
Expatriate footballers in Japan